The 24th New York State Legislature, consisting of the New York State Senate and the New York State Assembly, met from November 4, 1800, to April 8, 1801, during the sixth year of John Jay's governorship, in Albany.

Background
Under the provisions of the New York Constitution of 1777, amended by the re-apportionment of March 4, 1796, Senators were elected on general tickets in the senatorial districts for four-year terms. They were divided into four classes, and every year about one fourth of the Senate seats came up for election. Assemblymen were elected countywide on general tickets to a one-year term, the whole assembly being renewed annually.

In 1797, Albany was declared the State capital, and all subsequent Legislatures have been meeting there ever since. In 1799, the Legislature enacted that future Legislatures meet on the last Tuesday of January of each year unless called earlier by the governor.

Senator John Addison died in 1800, leaving a vacancy in the Middle District.

In 1800, Greene County was created from parts of Albany and Ulster counties, and was apportioned 2 seats in the Assembly, one each taken from Albany and Ulster.

In August 1800, U.S. Senator John Laurance (Fed.) resigned.

At this time the politicians were divided into two opposing political parties: the Federalists and the Democratic-Republicans.

Elections
The State election was held from April 29 to May 1, 1800. Senators William Denning (Southern D.), James Gordon (Eastern D.) and Jedediah Sanger (Western D.) were re-elected. Benjamin Huntting, Ebenezer Purdy (both Southern D.), James W. Wilkin, David Van Ness, Solomon Sutherland, John C. Hogeboom (all four Middle D.), Stephen Lush (Eastern D.) and Assemblyman Robert Roseboom (Western D.) were also elected to full terms in the Senate. Jacobus S. Bruyn (Middle D.) was elected to a one-year term to fill the vacancy. Gordon, Sanger and Lush were Federalists, the other nine were Democratic-Republicans.

Sessions
The Legislature met at the Old City Hall in Albany on November 4, 1800, to elect presidential electors; and the Senate adjourned on November 7, the Assembly on November 8.

Dem.-Rep. Samuel Osgood was elected Speaker with 62 votes against 31 for Federalist Dirck Ten Broeck.

On November 6, 1800, the Legislature elected 12 presidential electors, all Democratic-Republicans: William Floyd, Isaac Ledyard, Anthony Lispenard, Philip Van Cortlandt Jr., James Burt, Gilbert Livingston, Thomas Jenkins, Peter Van Ness, Robert Ellis, John Woodworth, Jeremiah Van Rensselaer and Jacob Eaker. They cast their votes for Thomas Jefferson and Aaron Burr.

On November 6, 1800, the Legislature elected John Armstrong (Dem.-Rep.) to fill the vacancy in the U.S. Senate.

The Legislature met for the regular session on January 27, 1801; and adjourned on April 8.

On January 27, 1801, John Armstrong was re-elected to a full term in the U.S. Senate.

On February 26, 1801, Gov. John Jay sent a message to the Assembly about the controversy that had arisen in the Council of Appointment concerning the right to nominate appointees. Jay held that only the governor could nominate somebody, and the councillors then could only approve or reject this nomination. The Dem.-Rep. councillors however claimed that they too had the right to nominate appointees, and Jay had adjourned the council and did not make any appointments anymore. Jay asked the Assembly to solve the problem, but they refused, claiming that it was a constitutional issue to be decided by the Governor and Council. Jay asked then the chancellor and the justices of the New York Supreme Court for their opinion, but they refused to give it, claiming that to give opinions was outside the scope of their constitutional duties. To find a way out of the impasse, the Legislature passed on April 6 an "Act Recommending a Convention" which called for the election of delegates to a convention, to consider amending the State Constitution concerning the Council of Appointment and the apportionment of the State Legislature.

State Senate

Districts
The Southern District (9 seats) consisted of Kings, New York, Queens, Richmond, Suffolk and Westchester counties.
The Middle District (12 seats) consisted of Dutchess, Orange, Ulster, Columbia, Delaware, Rockland and Greene counties.
The Eastern District (11 seats) consisted of Washington, Clinton, Rensselaer, Albany, Saratoga and Essex counties.
The Western District (11 seats) consisted of  Montgomery, Herkimer, Ontario, Otsego, Tioga, Onondaga, Schoharie, Steuben, Chenango, Oneida and Cayuga counties.

Note: There are now 62 counties in the State of New York. The counties which are not mentioned in this list had not yet been established, or sufficiently organized, the area being included in one or more of the abovementioned counties.

Members
The asterisk (*) denotes members of the previous Legislature who continued in office as members of this Legislature. Robert Roseboom changed from the Assembly to the Senate.

Employees
Clerk: Abraham B. Bancker

State Assembly

Districts

Albany County (8 seats)
Cayuga County (1 seat)
Chenango County (2 seats)
Clinton and Essex counties (1 seat)
Columbia County (6 seats)
Delaware County (2 seats)
Dutchess County (10 seats)
Greene County (2 seats)
Herkimer County (3 seats)
Kings County (1 seat)
Montgomery County (6 seats)
The City and County of New York (13 seats)
Oneida County (3 seats)
Onondaga County (1 seat)
Ontario and Steuben counties (2 seats)
Orange County (5 seats)
Otsego County (4 seats)
Queens County (4 seats)
Rensselaer County (6 seats)
Richmond County (1 seat)
Rockland County (1 seat)
Saratoga County (5 seats)
Schoharie County (1 seat)
Suffolk County (4 seats)
Tioga County (1 seat)
Ulster County (4 seats)
Washington County (6 seats)
Westchester County (5 seats)

Note: There are now 62 counties in the State of New York. The counties which are not mentioned in this list had not yet been established, or sufficiently organized, the area being included in one or more of the abovementioned counties.

Assemblymen
The asterisk (*) denotes members of the previous Legislature who continued as members of this Legislature.

Employees
Clerk: James Van Ingen
Sergeant-at-Arms: Ephraim Hunt
Doorkeeper: Peter Hansen

Notes

Sources
The New York Civil List compiled by Franklin Benjamin Hough (Weed, Parsons and Co., 1858) [see pg. 108f for Senate districts; pg. 117f for senators; pg. 148f for Assembly districts; pg. 174 for assemblymen; pg. 320 and 324 for presidential electors]
Election result Assembly, Cayuga Co. at project "A New Nation Votes", compiled by Phil Lampi, hosted by Tufts University Digital Library
Election result Assembly, Clinton and Essex Co. at project "A New Nation Votes"
Election result Assembly, Dutchess Co. at project "A New Nation Votes"
Election result Assembly, Kings Co. at project "A New Nation Votes"
Election result Assembly, Onondaga Co. at project "A New Nation Votes"
Election result Assembly, Queens Co. at project "A New Nation Votes"
Election result Assembly, Rensselaer Co. at project "A New Nation Votes"
Election result Assembly, Richmond Co. at project "A New Nation Votes"
Election result Assembly, Schoharie Co. at project "A New Nation Votes"
Election result Assembly, Suffolk Co. at project "A New Nation Votes"
Election result Assembly, Westchester Co. at project "A New Nation Votes"
Election result Senate, Southern D. at project "A New Nation Votes" [does not add up totals]
Partial election result Senate, Middle D. at project "A New Nation Votes" [gives only votes from Columbia and Dutchess counties]
Partial election result Senate, Eastern D. at project "A New Nation Votes" [gives only votes from Albany and Rensselaer counties]
Partial election result Senate, Western D. at project "A New Nation Votes" [gives only votes from Onondaga County]
Election result Speaker at project "A New Nation Votes"

1800 in New York (state)
1801 in New York (state)
024
1800 U.S. legislative sessions